The Danish language developed during the Middle Ages out of Old East Norse, the common predecessor of Danish and Swedish. It was a late form of common Old Norse. The Danish philologist Johannes Brøndum-Nielsen divided the history of Danish into "Old Danish" from 800 AD to 1525 and "Modern Danish" from 1525 and onwards. He subdivided Old Danish into "Runic Danish" (800–1100), Early Middle Danish (1100–1350) and Late Middle Danish (1350–1525).

Runic Danish

Old East Norse is in Sweden called Runic Swedish and in Denmark Runic Danish, but until the 12th century, the dialect was the same in the two countries. The dialects are called runic because the main body of text appears in the runic alphabet. Unlike Proto-Norse, which was written with the Elder Futhark alphabet, Old Norse was written with the Younger Futhark alphabet, which only had 16 letters. Due to the limited number of runes, some runes were used for a range of phonemes, such as the rune for the vowel u which was also used for the vowels o, ø and y, and the rune for i which was also used for e.

A change that separated Old East Norse (Runic Swedish/Danish) from Old West Norse was the change of the diphthong æi (Old West Norse ei) to the monophthong e, as in stæin to sten. This is reflected in runic inscriptions where the older read stain and the later stin. There was also a change of au as in dauðr into ø as in døðr. This change is shown in runic inscriptions as a change from tauþr into tuþr. Moreover, the øy (Old West Norse ey) diphthong changed into ø as well, as in the Old Norse word for "island".

Middle Danish

From 1100 and onwards, the dialect of Denmark began to diverge from that of Sweden. The innovations spread unevenly from Denmark which created a series of minor dialectal boundaries, isoglosses, ranging from Zealand to Svealand.
In the medieval period Danish emerged as a separate language from Swedish. The main written language was Latin, and the few Danish language texts preserved from this period are written in the Latin alphabet, although the runic alphabet seems to have lingered in popular usage in some areas. The main text types written in this period are laws, which were formulated in the vernacular language to be accessible also to those who were not Latinate. The Jutlandic Law and Scanian Law were written in vernacular Danish in the early 13th century. Beginning in 1350, Danish began to be used as a language of administration and new types of literature began to be written in the language, such as royal letters and testaments. The orthography in this period was not standardized nor was the spoken language, and the regional laws demonstrate the dialectal differences between the regions in which they were written. Throughout this period, Danish was in contact with Low German, and many Low German loan words were introduced.

Renaissance and Reformation
With the Protestant Reformation in 1536, Danish also became the language of religion, which sparked a new interest in using Danish as a literary language. It is also in this period that Danish begins to take on the linguistic traits that differentiate it from Swedish and Norwegian, such as the stød and the voicing of many stop consonants.

The first printed book in Danish dates from 1495, "Rimkrøniken" (the Rhyming Chronicle), a history book told in rhymed verses. The first complete translation of the Bible in Danish, the Bible of Christian III, some parts translated by Christiern Pedersen, was published in 1550. Pedersen's orthographic choices set the de facto standard for subsequent writing in Danish.

Modern Danish
The first translation of the Bible in Danish was published in 1550.

Some notable authors of works in Danish are existential philosopher Søren Kierkegaard, prolific fairy tale author Hans Christian Andersen, and playwrights Henrik Ibsen and Ludvig Holberg. Three 20th-century Danish authors have become Nobel Prize laureates in Literature: Karl Adolph Gjellerup and Henrik Pontoppidan (joint recipients in 1917) and Johannes Vilhelm Jensen (awarded 1944).

References

Bibliography

 

Danish language
Old Norse
Germanic language histories